Fillmore Township may refer to:

 Fillmore Township, Montgomery County, Illinois
 Fillmore Township, Iowa County, Iowa
 Fillmore Township, Michigan
 Fillmore Township, Fillmore County, Minnesota
 Fillmore Township, Divide County, North Dakota, in Divide County, North Dakota

Township name disambiguation pages